Connie Hicks (née Haigh), was an international lawn bowls competitor for Australia.

Bowls career

World Championships
Hicks won two silver medals and a bronze medal at the 1969 World Outdoor Bowls Championship in Sydney. The silver medals came in the team event (Taylor Trophy) and the triples with Norma Massey and Mary Ormsby. The bronze was in the fours event with Pam Hart, Jean Turnbull and Ormsby. 

Eight years later Hicks won the fours gold medal with Dot Jenkinson, Lorna Lucas and Merle Richardson, at the 1977 World Outdoor Bowls Championship in Worthing and the team event gold medal (the Taylor Trophy).

State
She played for the Royal Park Bowls Club in North Perth and won 10 State titles. Connie married fellow lawn bowler Charlie Hicks in 1944.

References

1924 births
2011 deaths
Australian female bowls players
Bowls World Champions
20th-century Australian women